1993 Gamba Osaka season

Review and events

League results summary

League results by round

Competitions

Domestic results

J.League

Suntory series

NICOS series

Emperor's Cup

J.League Cup

Player statistics

 † player(s) joined the team after the opening of this season.

Transfers

In:

Out:

Transfers during the season

In
Serguei Aleinikov (from Lecce on July)|*Kiril Metkov Mihov (from CSKA Sofia on August)

Out
Jia Xiuquan (on November)
Claudio (on November)

Notes

References

Other pages
 J. League official site
 Gamba Osaka official site

Gamba Osaka
Gamba Osaka seasons